The 1971 Southern Illinois Salukis baseball team represented the University of Southern Illinois in the 1968 NCAA University Division baseball season. The Salukis played their home games at Abe Martin Field. The team was coached by Itch Jones in his 2nd season at Southern Illinois.

The Salukis lost the College World Series, defeated by the USC Trojans in the championship game.

Roster

Schedule and results

! style="" | Regular Season (36–6)
|- valign="top"

|- align="center" bgcolor="#ccffcc"
| March 21 || at  || Unknown • Paradise, Nevada || 2–1 || 1–0 || 0–0
|- align="center" bgcolor="#ccffcc"
| March 22 || vs  || Unknown • Los Angeles, California || 4–1 || 2–0 || 0–0
|- align="center" bgcolor="#ffcccc"
| March 23 || at  || Unknown • Los Angeles, California || 5–10 || 2–1 || 0–0
|- align="center" bgcolor="#ffcccc"
| March 23 || vs  || Unknown • Los Angeles, California || 3–4 || 2–2 || 0–0
|- align="center" bgcolor="#ccffcc"
| March 24 || vs  || Unknown • Los Angeles, California || 8–2 || 3–2 || 0–0
|- align="center" bgcolor="#ccffcc"
| March 25 || vs  || Unknown • Los Angeles, California || 9–3 || 4–2 || 0–0
|- align="center" bgcolor="#ffcccc"
| March 26 || vs  || Unknown • Los Angeles, California || 5–6 || 4–3 || 0–0
|- align="center" bgcolor="#ccffcc"
| March 27 || vs Cal State Pomona || Unknown • Los Angeles, California || 6–0 || 5–3 || 0–0
|- align="center" bgcolor="#ccffcc"
| March 29 || at  || Lobo Field • Albuquerque, New Mexico || 13–11 || 6–3 || 0–0
|- align="center" bgcolor="#ccffcc"
| March 31 ||  || Abe Martin Field • Carbondale, Illinois || 9–6 || 7–3 || 0–0
|- align="center" bgcolor="#ccffcc"
| March 31 || Monmouth || Abe Martin Field • Carbondale, Illinois || 17–3 || 8–3 || 0–0
|-

|- align="center" bgcolor="#ccffcc"
| April 2 ||  || Abe Martin Field • Carbondale, Illinois || 6–2 || 9–3 || 0–0
|- align="center" bgcolor="#ffcccc"
| April 3 || Memphis State || Abe Martin Field • Carbondale, Illinois || 3–4 || 9–4 || 0–0
|- align="center" bgcolor="#ccffcc"
| April 3 || Memphis State || Abe Martin Field • Carbondale, Illinois || 6–2 || 10–4 || 0–0
|- align="center" bgcolor="#ccffcc"
| April 4 ||  || Abe Martin Field • Carbondale, Illinois || 10–0 || 11–4 || 0–0
|- align="center" bgcolor="#ccffcc"
| April 4 || MacMurray || Abe Martin Field • Carbondale, Illinois || 8–1 || 12–4 || 0–0
|- align="center" bgcolor="#ccffcc"
| April 9 ||  || Abe Martin Field • Carbondale, Illinois || 9–2 || 13–4 || 0–0
|- align="center" bgcolor="#ccffcc"
| April 10 || Tulsa || Abe Martin Field • Carbondale, Illinois || 9–1 || 14–4 || 0–0
|- align="center" bgcolor="#ccffcc"
| April 10 || Tulsa || Abe Martin Field • Carbondale, Illinois || 5–4 || 15–4 || 0–0
|- align="center" bgcolor="#ccffcc"
| April 12 ||  || Abe Martin Field • Carbondale, Illinois || 5–4 || 16–4 || 0–0
|- align="center" bgcolor="#ccffcc"
| April 16 ||  || Abe Martin Field • Carbondale, Illinois || 14–1 || 17–4 || 0–0
|- align="center" bgcolor="#ccffcc"
| April 17 || Illinois || Abe Martin Field • Carbondale, Illinois || 7–6 || 18–4 || 0–0
|- align="center" bgcolor="#ccffcc"
| April 17 || Illinois || Abe Martin Field • Carbondale, Illinois || 6–2 || 19–4 || 0–0
|- align="center" bgcolor="#ccffcc"
| April 20 || at  || Unknown • St. Louis, Missouri || 5–1 || 20–4 || 0–0
|- align="center" bgcolor="#ccffcc"
| April 23 ||  || Abe Martin Field • Carbondale, Illinois || 9–3 || 21–4 || 1–0
|- align="center" bgcolor="#ccffcc"
| April 24 || Indiana State || Abe Martin Field • Carbondale, Illinois || 5–1 || 22–4 || 2–0
|- align="center" bgcolor="#ffcccc"
| April 24 || Indiana State || Abe Martin Field • Carbondale, Illinois || 7–9 || 22–5 || 2–1
|- align="center" bgcolor="#ccffcc"
| April 30 || at  || Nick Denes Field • Bowling Green, Kentucky || 7–4 || 23–5 || 2–1
|-

|- align="center" bgcolor="#ccffcc"
| May 1 || at Western Kentucky || Nick Denes Field • Bowling Green, Kentucky || 5–3 || 24–5 || 2–1
|- align="center" bgcolor="#ffcccc"
| May 1 || at Western Kentucky || Nick Denes Field • Bowling Green, Kentucky || 7–8 || 24–6 || 2–1
|- align="center" bgcolor="#ccffcc"
| May 4 || at  || Unknown • Evansville, Indiana || 22–2 || 25–6 || 2–1
|- align="center" bgcolor="#ccffcc"
| May 7 ||  || Abe Martin Field • Carbondale, Illinois || 13–6 || 26–6 || 3–1
|- align="center" bgcolor="#ccffcc"
| May 8 || Illinois State || Abe Martin Field • Carbondale, Illinois || 7–1 || 27–6 || 4–1
|- align="center" bgcolor="#ccffcc"
| May 8 || Illinois State || Abe Martin Field • Carbondale, Illinois || 12–2 || 28–6 || 5–1
|- align="center" bgcolor="#ccffcc"
| May 14 || at  || Ralph McKinzie Field • DeKalb, Illinois || 5–4 || 29–6 || 6–1
|- align="center" bgcolor="#ccffcc"
| May 15 || at Northern Illinois || Ralph McKinzie Field • DeKalb, Illinois || 8–6 || 30–6 || 7–1
|- align="center" bgcolor="#ccffcc"
| May 15 || at Northern Illinois || Ralph McKinzie Field • DeKalb, Illinois || 17–8 || 31–6 || 8–1
|- align="center" bgcolor="#ccffcc"
| May 18 ||  || Abe Martin Field • Carbondale, Illinois || 9–3 || 32–6 || 8–1
|- align="center" bgcolor="#ccffcc"
| May 18 || McKendree || Abe Martin Field • Carbondale, Illinois || 7–0 || 33–6 || 8–1
|- align="center" bgcolor="#ccffcc"
| May 21 ||  || Abe Martin Field • Carbondale, Illinois || 8–1 || 34–6 || 9–1
|- align="center" bgcolor="#ccffcc"
| May 22 || Ball State || Abe Martin Field • Carbondale, Illinois || 9–1 || 35–6 || 10–1
|- align="center" bgcolor="#ccffcc"
| May 22 || Ball State || Abe Martin Field • Carbondale, Illinois || 7–3 || 36–6 || 11–1
|- align="center" bgcolor="white"

|-
! style="" | Postseason (7–3)
|-

|- align="center" bgcolor="#ccffcc"
| May 27 || vs  || John H. Kobs Field • East Lansing, Michigan || 5–4 || 37–6 || 11–1
|- align="center" bgcolor="#ffcccc"
| May 28 || vs  || John H. Kobs Field • East Lansing, Michigan || 10–11 || 37–7 || 11–1
|- align="center" bgcolor="#ccffcc"
| May 28 || vs Ohio || John H. Kobs Field • East Lansing, Michigan || 7–1 || 38–7 || 11–1
|- align="center" bgcolor="#ccffcc"
| May 29 || vs Cincinnati || John H. Kobs Field • East Lansing, Michigan || 6–2 || 39–7 || 11–1
|- align="center" bgcolor="#ccffcc"
| May 29 || vs Cincinnati || John H. Kobs Field • East Lansing, Michigan || 10–7 || 40–7 || 11–1
|-

|- align="center" bgcolor="#ccffcc"
| June 12 || vs  || Johnny Rosenblatt Stadium • Omaha, Nebraska || 5–4 || 41–7 || 11–1
|- align="center" bgcolor="#ccffcc"
| June 13 || vs USC || Johnny Rosenblatt Stadium • Omaha, Nebraska || 8–3 || 42–7 || 11–1
|- align="center" bgcolor="#ffcccc"
| June 14 || vs  || Johnny Rosenblatt Stadium • Omaha, Nebraska || 4–9 || 42–8 || 11–1
|- align="center" bgcolor="#ccffcc"
| June 15 || vs Texas–Pan American || Johnny Rosenblatt Stadium • Omaha, Nebraska || 8–6 || 43–8 || 11–1
|- align="center" bgcolor="#ffcccc"
| June 17 || vs USC || Johnny Rosenblatt Stadium • Omaha, Nebraska || 2–7 || 43–9 || 11–1
|- align="center" bgcolor="white"

| Schedule Source:

Awards and honors 
Mike Eden
All Tournament Team

Dan Radison
All Tournament Team

Jim Dwyer
All Tournament Team

Larry Calufetti
All Tournament Team

Bob Sedik
AACBC Third Team All-American

Salukis in the 1971 MLB Draft
The following members of the Southern Illinois Salukis baseball program were drafted in the 1971 Major League Baseball Draft.

References

Southern Illinois Salukis baseball seasons
Southern Illinois Salukis baseball
College World Series seasons
Southern Illinois